The 2018 Portuguese Social Democratic Party leadership election was held on 13 January 2018. The leadership election was held after then PSD leader Pedro Passos Coelho confirmed he would not run for another term in the aftermath of the poor results of the PSD in the 2017 local elections.

Only two candidates came forward: Rui Rio, former mayor of Porto, and Pedro Santana Lopes, former PSD leader, Prime Minister and mayor of Lisbon. This was Santana Lopes 5th leadership campaign, as he also ran in 1995, 1996, 2000, and 2008. As only two candidates were on the ballot, a second round wasn't necessary. On January 13, 2018, Rui Rio defeated Pedro Santana Lopes by a 54% to 46% margin, thus becoming the new leader of the PSD. Pedro Santana Lopes was, again, defeated in a PSD leadership contest for a 5th time. Rui Rio was confirmed as the new party leader on a party national congress held in Lisbon between 16 and 18 February 2018. Six months after this leadership election, Santana Lopes left the PSD to form his own party, Alliance.

Candidates

Withdrawn candidates
Luís Montenegro, PSD caucus leader (2011–2017)
Miguel Pinto Luz, Deputy mayor of Cascais city (2017–Incumbent)

Opinion polls

All voters

PSD voters/PSD members

Results

See also
 Social Democratic Party (Portugal)
 List of political parties in Portugal
 Elections in Portugal

References

External links
Election Results 
PSD Official Website

2018 in Portugal
Political party leadership elections in Portugal
2018 elections in Portugal
January 2018 events in Portugal
Portuguese Social Democratic Party leadership election